This is a list of flags used in Mauritius.

National flag

Presidential flag

Ensigns

Subnational flags

Historical flags

Colonial flags

Royal flags

Viceregal flags

References

External links
 

Lists and galleries of flags
Flags
Flags